Henry Lewis was an American football guard who played one season with the Louisville Brecks of the American Professional Football Association.

References

External links
Just Sports Stats

Year of birth missing
Year of death missing
American football offensive guards
Louisville Brecks players